Ain Shams (also spelled Ayn or Ein - ,) is a district in the Eastern Area of Cairo, Egypt. The name means "Eye of the Sun" in Arabic, referring to the fact that the district contained the ruins of the ancient city of Heliopolis, once the spiritual centre of ancient Egyptian sun-worship, and settled since 3100 BCE during the since the Predynastic Period. However, administratively the  visible ruins today lie in the district of al-Matariya.

See also
Ain Shams University

External links
Egyptian temple found under Cairo market ABC News, 27 February 2006.
 Parts of King Nakhtanebu I's shrine uncovered in Cairo // Ahram Online, 4 October 2015.

Works cited